The 2022 NRL season was the 115th of professional rugby league in Australia and the 25th season run by the National Rugby League.

Regular season 
All times are in AEDT (UTC+11:00) up until the 3rd of April and AEST (UTC+10:00) from then on.

Round 1

Round 2 

The match between the Sydney Roosters and Manly-Warringah Sea Eagles was originally scheduled to be played at Central Coast Stadium but was moved to the SCG due to venue availability with Sydney's round 18 match against the St George Illawarra Dragons moved from the SCG to the Central Coast Stadium.

Round 3 (Multicultural Round) 

The crowd of 11,253 at the Penrith vs Newcastle match is the highest NRL attendance in Bathurst's history.
Canberra equaled their best ever comeback after being down 22 – 0 against the Gold Coast Titans.

Round 4

Round 5

Round 6 (Easter Round)

Round 7 (ANZAC Round)

Round 8

Round 9 

The Cronulla Sharks became the first team in 14 years, since Manly defeated Canberra in 2008, to win a game when reduced to 12 players.

Round 10 (Magic Round) 

 Manly were held scoreless for the first time since the 2013 Qualifying Final, ending a 208 game streak of scoring points in games, their longest streak in club history.

Round 11

Round 12 (Indigenous Round)

Round 13

Round 14 

Brent Naden became the first Wests Tigers player to be sent off since 2002.

Round 15

Round 16 

Edrick Lee became the first player in Newcastle Knights history to score 5 tries in a single match.
The Warriors vs Tigers game was the first NRL game played in New Zealand since Round 24, 2019.

Round 17

Round 18

Round 19

Round 20

Round 21 

Salter Oval in Bundaberg, along with the city itself, are scheduled to host their first ever NRL match for premiership points.

Round 22

Round 23 

 This was the NRL highest scoring round, of a total of 466 points scored by the 16 teams combined.
 The Sydney Roosters vs Wests Tigers saw the Roosters record their biggest win since round 6, 1935, their 2nd highest score ever, scoring the most tries in a game since round 13, 1982 as well as the overall biggest ever win and score at the SCG while the Wests Tigers recorded their biggest ever loss since their formation in 2000 with the loss being the worst for either side of the venture since the Western Suburbs Magpies loss in round 8, 1910.

Round 24

Round 25

Finals series 

The crowd of 21,863 for the first qualifying final between Penrith and Parramatta is the highest crowd at BlueBet Stadium since round 19, 2010.
The Sydney Roosters vs South Sydney Rabbitohs had seven players sin binned with two players sin binned twice, the most in a game since the formation of the National Rugby League in 1998.
A moments silence was held prior to all week one games following the death of Queen Elizabeth II.
The crowd of 25,372 for the second preliminary final between North Queensland and Parramatta is the highest crowd for an NRL game in Townsville since round 23, 2011.
The crowd of 82,415 for the Grand Final is the highest crowd Penrith have played in front of, and the highest crowd for Parramatta since the 2009 Grand Final.

Bracket

References 

2022 NRL season